Star Wars: Catalyst: A Rogue One Novel is a science-fiction novel written by James Luceno that was published on November 15, 2016. It is set in the Star Wars universe and takes place in the time period from the Clone Wars to a couple years after Revenge of the Sith, serving as a prelude to the 2016 film Rogue One: A Star Wars Story. It relates the story of the Galactic Republic's and later the Galactic Empire's project to develop its superweapon, the Death Star. The novel serves to create a backstory both to Rogue One and the original Star Wars (1977).

Catalyst was announced in July 2016 at the Star Wars Celebration Europe event in London during a Star Wars Publishing panel session.

Plot 
During the Clone Wars, the Galactic Republic begins working on a moon-sized battle station based on a Separatist design, hoping to complete its construction before the Separatists potentially finish their own station. However, the Republic finds that building the primary weapon of the station will entail a breakthrough in energy enhancement. Lieutenant Commander Orson Krennic offers to recruit one of the finest scientists in the galaxy, an energy scientist named Galen Erso, to provide the breakthrough. Krennic has a personal connection with Erso, becoming friends while studying at the same university.

Meanwhile, Erso, a neutralist, is working on the planet Vallt doing energy research for Zerpen Industries, when the planetary government is overthrown in a coup sympathetic to the Separatists. Galen is imprisoned in a bid to force his loyalty to the Separatists. His pregnant wife Lyra is also imprisoned and gives birth to a daughter, Jyn.

Galen, Lyra and Jyn are rescued by Krennic, masquerading as a Zerpen representative, making an exchange for the Ersos. Safely off-planet, Krennic reveals he is working for the Republic, and a Republic battleship destroys the government complex of Vallt while Krennic and the Ersos watch. On Coruscant, Krennic and other members of the military work to subtly persuade Galen to join the battle station project under construction in orbit around the planet of Geonosis.

Krennic finds a non-research position for Galen at Helical HyperCom on the planet Lokori. Galen and his family move to Lokori, which comes under regular Separatist attack. At the end of a major offensive which has very nearly conquered Lokori, the attack is suspended. It is learned that the Clone Wars are over, the Republic has become an Empire, the Separatist leadership was killed and the Jedi Order destroyed. The Ersos move back to Coruscant, where Krennic has set up the Project Celestial Power project for Galen to continue his energy research with kyber crystals, ostensibly to provide power sources to Empire worlds, but secretly a cover project for the weapon construction of the battle station, which continues to be constructed, despite the war being over.

Krennic hires Obitt and his smugglers to drop decommissioned weapons to the planets Samovar and Wadi Raffa. The weapon drops are a ruse for the Empire to enter on the pretext of suspected anarchist activity. Once the weapons are found, the Empire uses the circumstances to set up occupying forces on the planets, taking over mining corporations on the worlds. The pretext gives the Empire the chance to exploit the two worlds' resources, overriding the environmental protections in force on the two "Legacy" worlds.

Unknown to Galen, Krennic has set up a satellite facility on the planet Malpaz where Erso's former colleague Dagio Belcoze is attempting to test the energy output. The experiments on Malpaz blow up and kill ten thousand on the planet. The damage is attributed to anarchist elements opposing the Empire. Krennic becomes suspicious of Lyra's intentions and influence over Galen and arranges for her to lead a survey team of the planet Alpinn looking for kyberite and the possibility of kyber crystals. After the survey is over, Obitt shows Lyra and Nari the planets of Samovar and Wadi Raffa, protected planets mostly destroyed by Empire mining for the battle station project.

Lyra returns to Coruscant to find Galen absorbed in his research, and the Celestial project now under tight security. Galen was developing serious suspicions about the use of his energy research, but chose not to discuss it with Lyra without stronger proof. Galen continued to make breakthroughs with a boulder-size kyber, learning how to use its properties to amplify energy beams. His work led to a breakthrough and Krennic arranged to have a Star Destroyer set up with a twin laser array, which was tested successfully in deep space.

Meanwhile, Krennic had set up another smuggling mission for Obitt to the Salient system. In secret, Obitt has arranged with Saw Gerrera to warn the Salient system of the Empire's intentions, letting them prepare for an Empire invasion. After the drop, Tarkin brings a Star Destroyer to demand access to Salient, as was done on Samovar and Wadi Raffa. This time, the system starts fighting with the Empire, and destroying any facilities that the Empire can use. Tarkin's forces are tied down in battle, and he suspects that Krennic has allowed Obitt to warn the Salient system, likely as an attempt to further his career over Tarkin's.

Krennic's research team, who are unaware of the true purpose of their energy research and questions Krennic, demands to be released from the program. Krennic promises them full releases from their contracts, but instead kills them all, destroying their facility on Hypori with turbolaser blasts from his Star Destroyer. He returns to Coruscant, where he finds more evidence of suspicious behaviour by Galen and Lyra. He threatens Lyra with prosecution, which only leads to Lyra forcing a talk with Galen in secret, where they both reveal their suspicions about the project.

Tarkin is finally successful in subjugating the Salient system and captures Obitt. Obitt was severely injured in the battle, but wakes up on Tarkin's Destroyer fully healed. Under interrogation by Tarkin, Obitt reveals all of his recent activity with the Ersos and Krennic. Tarkin decides to use Obitt to strike back at Krennic.

On Coruscant, Krennic is confronted by the Ersos. Krennic leaves them, worried about their intentions when he learns that Obitt's ship has been tracked coming to Coruscant. Krennic believes that Obitt may be helping the Ersos to escape and orders the project security to hold them, but it is too late. Krennic arrives at the spaceport to confront Obitt and prevent the Ersos escape. However, Obitt has arranged for Gerrera to arrive in another ship and the Ersos leave Coruscant.

Obitt continues to work for Tarkin, reporting on Krennic's activities, while also looking for the Ersos for Krennic. Tarkin is assigned to the bases of the battle station construction to supervise security, plotting to take control of the battle station project, while Krennic is demoted for losing Galen Erso. The Ersos, meanwhile have escaped with Gerrera to the planet Lah'mu.

Characters 
 Galen Erso – A scientist involved in energy crystal and energy enrichment research, and an old friend of Lt. Commander Krennic.
 Lyra Erso – The wife of Galen, and the mother of Jyn.
 Lieutenant Commander Orson Krennic – Commander in the Republic Corps of Engineers, Special Weapons Group.
 Commander Wilhuff Tarkin – Adjutant General for the Republic Navy.
 Captain Has Obitt – Dressellian smuggler
 Saw Gerrera – Smuggler and former soldier.
 Archduke Poggle the Lesser – Leader of the planet of Geonosis.
 Jyn Erso – The daughter of Galen and Lyra.
 Vice Chancellor Mas Amedda – Vizier to Emperor Palpatine and overseer of the battle station's construction

Reception 

Den of Geek's Megan Crouse gave Catalyst a 3.5/5 rating. Nerdist's Amy Ratcliff described Catalyst as an exciting read but not without its flaws. Jim Lehane of the website Adventures In Poor Taste stated Catalyst was insightful but only half the story. Books-a-Million rated the novel 4.8/5.

Publication 
Catalyst was released in hardback and electronic versions on November 15, 2016. A mass market edition was released on May 2, 2017, the same day Disney Lucasfilm Press released Star Wars: Rebel Rising, which follows the events of Catalyst.

Sequels 
The conclusion of Catalyst leads into the first events of the Rogue One: A Star Wars Story novel, released in December 2016. Jyn Erso's story during the period from the prologue of Rogue One to later events in that film and novel are told in the novel Star Wars: Rebel Rising, released in hardcover in 2017.

References

External links 

 Listing on Penguin Random House

2016 American novels
2016 science fiction novels
Books based on Star Wars
Del Rey books
Novels by James Luceno